Steffen Bringmann (born 11 March 1964 in Leipzig) is a retired East German sprinter who specialized in the 100 metres.

Biography
At the 1986 European Championships he won silver medals in the 100 metres and in the 4 × 100 metres relay, the latter with teammates Thomas Schröder, Olaf Prenzler and Frank Emmelmann. He had already won the silver medal in the 60 metres at the European Indoor Championships the same year. He became East German champion in 1987 and 1989 and German champion in 1991 and 1992.

His personal best time was 10.13 seconds, achieved in June 1986 in Jena. This ranks him sixth among German 100 m sprinters, behind Julian Reus, Frank Emmelmann, Thomas Schröder, Sven Matthes and Eugen Ray.

See also
 German all-time top lists - 100 metres

References

1964 births
Living people
Athletes from Leipzig
People from Bezirk Leipzig
East German male sprinters
Olympic athletes of East Germany
Athletes (track and field) at the 1988 Summer Olympics
European Athletics Championships medalists
German national athletics champions